William Leslie Chapman (7 February 1910 – 22 July 1971) was an Australian politician and a member of the New South Wales Legislative Assembly between 1956 and 1962. He was a  member of the Liberal Party.

Early life
Chapman was born in Singleton, New South Wales. He was the son of a policeman and was raised by his grandparents in the Penrith area. He was educated to elementary level and initially worked as a porter for the New South Wales Government Railways but was retrenched during the Great Depression. He commenced a carrier business in 1934 with one truck and eventually built this into a 24-truck fleet. He was involved in community groups in the Penrith region including  Rotary and the Australian Red Cross. Chapman was elected as an alderman to Penrith City Council between 1948 and 1959 and between 1961 and 1971. He was the mayor between 1950 and 1956 and between 1961 and 1968.

State politics
Chapman was elected to the New South Wales Parliament as the Liberal Party member for Nepean at the 1956. The sitting Liberal member Joseph Jackson had retired and Chapman defeated Jim Chalmers, the Independent Labor member for Hartley, who attempted to transfer to Nepean. Chapman retained the seat at 1959 election. He was defeated by Labor's Alfred Bennett in 1962 after an unfavourable redistribution made Nepean a notionally Labor seat. He failed to gain Liberal Party endorsement for the 1965 election and left the party in 1966. He did not hold a ministerial, party or parliamentary position.

References

 

1910 births
1971 deaths
Liberal Party of Australia members of the Parliament of New South Wales
Members of the New South Wales Legislative Assembly
20th-century Australian politicians
Mayors of Penrith, New South Wales